WJIB (740 AM) is a radio station based in Cambridge, Massachusetts and serving the Boston DMA.   The playlist draws from 5,400 records, concentrating on adult standards from the 1930s through the 1960s, and softer pop music from the 1950s and 1960s. It is owned by Bob Bittner Broadcasting, along with sister station WJTO in Bath, Maine. WJIB runs no commercial advertisements (instead relying on listener donations, in the same vein as a non-commercial station), and broadcast in AM stereo until the summer of 2012. On August 4, 2017, the station began simulcasting on an FM translator at 101.3 MHz, W267CE.

WJIB is an indirect successor to a previous Boston FM station at 96.9 MHz with the same call sign (now WBQT, owned by Beasley Broadcast Group) which in turn descended from WXHR, one of the first FM stations in the Boston area. Coincidentally, what is now WJIB was once owned by Harvey Radio Laboratories, the same company that owned WXHR/WJIB-FM. The AM station was first known as WTAO, then WXHR, and later as WCAS. In 1967, a year after they were sold to a joint venture of Kaiser Broadcasting and the Boston Globe, WXHR became WCAS while WXHR-FM changed to WJIB, featured the beautiful music format, and became well known for a nautical-themed station identification featuring a buoy bell and a seagull (now used in modified form by WOCN-FM on Cape Cod). WJIB-FM became WCDJ, a smooth jazz station, in 1990, and the call sign WJIB lapsed.

After Kaiser/Globe took over, the AM side at first broadcast a format with music and local news of interest to listeners in Cambridge and nearby communities, but was not very successful. By 1969, WCAS had flipped to Oldies. This was followed in 1972 by a soft rock format that, by 1973, had evolved into a folk/rock format which, while not enormously successful, gained a devoted following in the Boston area. In 1974 and then again in 1975, WCAS was almost sold to religious broadcasters, but both times, citizens groups intervened and thwarted the sales. The format continued even after Kaiser finally sold the station, in 1976, but ended with a sale of the station in 1981 after the then-owners, Dan Murphy and Mel Stone, were forced to file bankruptcy for WCAS. The rest of the 1980s would see a revolving door of owners, call letters, and formats. In the summer of 1991, Bob Bittner purchased the station, then known as WLVG ("We love God") and programming a Black Gospel format. Bittner changed the format to "Earth Radio" (a blend of contemporary music with environmentally-aware public service spots) under the call letters WWEA.

The WJIB call letters were applied for by Bittner in 1992 and were granted to him by the Federal Communications Commission (FCC) for the 740 station in Cambridge. Once having gained the WJIB call letters, Bittner switched the station to beautiful music on August 4, 1992, expanding it slightly as the station gained success, and then gradually morphed it into an adult standards station with a slight remainder of beautiful music in the mix, totally programmed by Bittner (WJTO is an almost exact copy music-wise). The station's studio still occupies a section of the original building owned by Harvey Radio Labs, the original proprietors of WXHR and WTAO.

Originally a daytime-only station, WJIB gained nighttime power in the early 1990s with an output of five watts. Despite this meager power, WJIB's nighttime signal can be heard inside of Massachusetts Route 128; just outside the 128 belt, listeners usually get Toronto's CFZM at night, with a format similar to that of WJIB.

During the spring and summer of 2006, a small construction developer circulated a petition in the local Fresh Pond, Cambridge neighborhood to gauge community support or opposition for tearing down the Concord Avenue buildings that originally housed WTAO and currently house WJIB.  The firm proposed the removal of the buildings owned by Cambridge Self Storage, a rental storage company, and their replacement with 220+ 3-4 story condominiums and townhouses. The proposal ran into considerable community opposition, citing traffic congestion on Concord Avenue and surrounding roads.

WCAS
The station was known as WCAS from 1967 to the early 1980s. The call letters referred to "Watertown, Cambridge, Arlington and Somerville and Belmont" (where the B was said to be "silent").  It became a local favorite during the 1970s for its eclectic mix of music (L.A. folk-rock, jazz, bluegrass, country and western were only part of the playlist) and its support of local issues and musicians, notably through special live concerts and the Live at Passim's series of broadcasts. WCAS evolved to this unique format in 1973, after dabbling in soft rock, in 1972, and in Oldies, prior to that. In 1976, the Harvard Crimson wrote: "The least pretentious station around is WCAS at 740 AM, which mixes country, soft rock, and folk nicely, and goes easy on the ads."

One of the station's limitations added to its character: because a limited broadcast license obliged it to go off the air at sunset, one freelancer developed a series of humorous station sign-offs which became mini-hits in themselves.

The "Live at Passim's" broadcast was done on Sundays from Club Passim (formerly the legendary Club 47). It paired local acts with national headliners at Passim's coffeehouse such as Ry Cooder, Tom Waits and Jimmy Buffett (the latter two then relatively obscure). The idea of promoting local music by broadcasting from what was then the top folk club in the area was originated by then-program director Rick Starr, who hired local performer Jim Chevallier to produce and host the program. Typically, national acts headlining at the club were the main act, preceded by local Boston-Cambridge musicians. The show's format generally imposed an all acoustic approach like that later used by MTV Unplugged. One of the first acts to appear on the show was Jimmy Buffett, then performing with only a bass player. Ry Cooder and Tom Waits appeared soon after that. The Irish traditional group The Boys of the Lough not only appeared on the show but, in 1975, released an album titled "Live at Passim's".

One duo which appeared at the club and on the show was Buckingham Nicks - that is, Lindsey Buckingham and Stevie Nicks who would shortly join Fleetwood Mac.

In addition to live broadcasts, the station sometimes played songs on tape from local artists. One of these, "Somerville", was a satirical comment on that local city, written by David Misch, who would later write for the TV shows Mork and Mindy and Saturday Night Live . Another was "Marblehead Morning", a gentle acoustic homage to the town of Marblehead written by Mason Daring, who would soon become the composer for most of John Sayles's films.

The station's local popularity was never sufficient to make it very profitable, and Wickus Island Broadcasting, which owned it through the latter half of the 1970s and suffered increasing losses, was obliged to declare bankruptcy at the start of the 1980s. WCAS finally went under in early 1981, and became gospel station WLVG. Prior to that, WCAS had two close calls in which they were nearly sold to religious broadcasters, once in late 1973, and again in 1975. However, in both of those situations, there was a loud public outcry which disrupted the sales, and enabled WCAS to last as long as it did. (Singer David Misch played a key role in organizing these.)

The call letters WCAS formerly were assigned to a station in Gadsden, Alabama at 570 on the dial owned by Charles A. Smithgall, from 1955 till 1960.  Today that station is WAAX.

2007 fundraising drive 
When a change in the BMI and ASCAP licensing was tied to ratings in 2007, the fees WJIB was to pay increased by a factor of six. On March 13, 2007, following the station's traditional Noon broadcast of the national anthem, Bob Bittner announced that the station will begin accepting non-tax-deductible listener donations, seeking to raise approximately $88,000 annually to pay the station's operating expenses, which did not include any salary to Bittner.  Bittner specified that donations should be personal checks; no credit cards would be accepted, since doing so would direct fees to lenders who encourage America's mass indebtedness.  An announcement was made at 5 p.m. on April 25, 2007 that six weeks after the initial announcement, WJIB had reached its fundraising goal.

Each year since, Bittner has done similar annual fundraising drives up to and including in 2016, and thanks to loyal listeners, has been able to raise the money to keep the station on the air.   In addition to listener donations, some Sunday-morning programming time was sold to local churches and religious organizations, which added to the station's revenue.

From 1997 through 2016, Bittner purchased several other stations in Maine to broadcast a similar music format on WJTO in Bath, WLAM in Lewiston, WLVP in Gorham, and WJYE in Gardiner (WJYE was sold in 2019 and is now WHTP).

Translator

References

External links
 WJIB history at Bostonradio.org
 FCC - Original WTAO Radio Tower/Studio location coordinates
 Audio of the 4/25/07 fundraising announcement heard over WJIB.
 740 WCAS website
 The Boston Radio Dial: WJIB(AM) - includes history of WCAS
 Harvard Crimson article from 1977 on local music, mentioning WCAS
 MIT's The Tech with 1979 article mentioning WCAS
 Boston Globe mention of defunct WCAS
 DX Listening Digest with mention of brief stint at WCAS as news station

 
 

JIB
Adult standards radio stations in the United States
Oldies radio stations in the United States
Radio stations established in 1948
Kaiser Broadcasting
JIB
Cambridge, Massachusetts
Mass media in Middlesex County, Massachusetts
1948 establishments in Massachusetts